Gillian Backhouse (born 20 June 1991) is an Australian triathlete. She won the gold medal in the mixed relay event at the 2018 Commonwealth Games.

References

1991 births
Australian female triathletes
Commonwealth Games gold medallists for Australia
Commonwealth Games medallists in triathlon
Living people
Sportspeople from Sydney
Triathletes at the 2018 Commonwealth Games
20th-century Australian women
21st-century Australian women
Sportswomen from New South Wales
Medallists at the 2018 Commonwealth Games